Greenly Island can refer to:

 Greenly Island (South Australia), an island off the coast of the Eyre Peninsula in Australia
 Greenly Island Conservation Park, includes the above island
 Greenly Island, Canada, an island in Quebec, Canada

See also  
 Greenly
 Green Island